Odin Computer Graphics were a Liverpool-based computer games developer who came to prominence in the mid-1980s with a variety of titles for the ZX Spectrum, Commodore 64 and Amstrad CPC home computers.

History
Odin consisted of Managing Director Paul McKenna; programmers Steve Wetherill, Robbie Tinman, Marc Dawson (now Wilding), Keith Robinson, George Barnes, Tommy Laningan, Derrick Rowson, and Stefan Walker; artists Paul Salmon, Stuart Fotheringham, and Colin Grunes; and musician Keith Tinman. Bernie Duggs and musician Fred Gray are also credited. Fotheringham and Dawson had previously worked for Software Projects. Some other staff members had previously worked for Imagine Software.

Prior to the release of their debut title, Nodes of Yesod, in 1985, Odin had previously released a number of games under the name Thor. Although they developed a couple of in-house titles as Thor, they mainly acquired the publishing rights to homegrown titles from anonymous bedroom programmers. These early titles were mostly regarded as critical disappointments but not commercial failures. When Thor decided to switch to in-house development, Paul McKenna (managing director & owner) thought it appropriate to form a new company, hence Odin Computer Graphics was born.

Nodes of Yesod became an instant critical and commercial success, prompting Telecomsoft (the software division of British Telecom) to offer them a six-figure contract to develop ten games within a 12-month period. While Odin's later games (including Robin of the Wood and Heartland) were very well received, some later titles failed to live up to expected BT standards. During this period, the warehouse area attached to the Odin studio was used by Telecomsoft as a distribution warehouse and to store thousands of copies of games on their Firebird, Rainbird and Beyond labels.

Just prior to the Telecom deal Odin had secured a major contract with Capcom.  They were to develop Robin Hood for coin-operated arcade machines and Capcom's Gun.Smoke for the home computer format. Unfortunately the contracts arrived a day late. Paul McKenna still has the original contracts from Capcom in his possession.

Odin made a very deliberate attempt to ensure they were mistaken for Ultimate Play the Game, one of the most critically acclaimed game developers of the 1980s. As well as establishing a very similar name (Odin Computer Graphics vs. Ashby Computer Graphics), many of their games were heavily inspired by Ultimate's output (Odin's Nodes of Yesod certainly owes a considerable debt to Ultimate's Underwurlde). The advertisements for Odin's games, which won many acclaimed awards such as Golden Joystick Awards for best advertising in 1985 and 1986, were reminiscent of 1980s popular print retailer Athena and also bore some resemblance to the highly stylised, airbrushed artwork that graced the adverts for Ultimate's games.

In 1987, Odin finally closed their doors, mainly due to an inability to expand the size of their teams while maintaining the quality that had put the company on the map in the first place. Although they delivered more than all the necessary titles to fulfill their contract, Telecomsoft deemed several of them to be not worthy of release. By this time many of Odin's core programmers and artists had already jumped ship. Several ex-Odin staff initially joined Denton Designs, another Liverpool-based games developer, before going their separate ways.

In 2005, Paul McKenna reformed Odin Computer Graphics Ltd, to develop and produce new titles and convert Nodes of Yesod, Arc of Yesod, Heartland and Robin of the Wood on the Mobile Phone formats.

In 2010, Odin Computer Graphics, Ltd., in conjunction with Uztek Games, Inc., released Nodes Of Yesod for the iPhone. A web browser version built with Adobe Flash was also released in the same year.

Games developed

 Nodes of Yesod (1985; ZX Spectrum, C64, Amstrad CPC, Enterprise 64/128)
 Robin of the Wood (1985; ZX Spectrum, C64)
 The Arc of Yesod (1985; ZX Spectrum, C64)
 I.C.U.P.S. (1986; ZX Spectrum, C64)
 Mission A.D. (1986; C64)
 Heartland (1986; ZX Spectrum, C64, Amstrad CPC)
 Hypa-Ball (1986; ZX Spectrum, C64)
 On the Tiles (1987; C64)
 Sidewize (1987; ZX Spectrum, C64)
 U.F.O. (1987; C64)
 The Plot (1988; ZX Spectrum, Amstrad CPC) [Originally titled 'The Gunpowder Plot']
 Scary Monsters (1988; Commodore 64)
 Crosswize (1988; ZX Spectrum)
 Gladiator (unreleased)
 Tank Game (unreleased)
 P.L.O.D. (unreleased)
 Lusitania (unreleased)

References 

Defunct video game companies of the United Kingdom